List of rivers flowing in the province of Central Sulawesi, island of Sulawesi, Indonesia.

In alphabetical order

See also
 List of rivers of Indonesia
 List of rivers of Sulawesi

References